Britt Ruysschaert (born 27 May 1994) is a Belgian volleyball player. She is a member of the Belgium women's national volleyball team and played for Asterix Kieldrecht in 2014.

She was part of the Belgian national team at the 2014 FIVB Volleyball Women's World Championship in Italy, and the 2016 FIVB Volleyball World Grand Prix.

Clubs
  Asterix Kieldrecht (2011–2017)
Antwerp Ladies (2017-now)

References

External links
 

1994 births
Living people
Belgian women's volleyball players
Place of birth missing (living people)
Volleyball players at the 2015 European Games
European Games competitors for Belgium
Wing spikers
21st-century Belgian women